Imbira guaiana is a species of land planarian in the subfamily Geoplaninae. It is the type species of the genus Imbira and is found in Brazil.

Description 
Its dorsal surface has a greyish-olive color and the ventral side is yellowish-olive. The numerous small eyes are arranged long the body margins from the anterior to the posterior tip.

Etymology 
The specific epithet guaiana refers to the Kaingang people (also known as guainás or guaianos) that in the past inhabited the region where the species is found.

Distribution 
The only known place of occurrence of I. guaiana is the São Francisco de Paula National Forest in southern Brazil.

References 

Geoplanidae
Invertebrates of Brazil